Aliabad-e Yek (also Romanized as ‘Alīābād-e Yek; also known as ‘Alīābād) is a village in Ravar Rural District, in the Central District of Ravar County, Kerman Province, Iran. At the 2006 census, its population was 19, in 7 families.

References 

Populated places in Ravar County